My Autobiography is a book by Benito Mussolini.  It is a dictated, narrative autobiography recounting the author's youth, his years as an agitator and journalist, his experiences in World War I, the formation and revolutionary struggles of the Fascist Party, the March on Rome, and his early years in power. It was first published in 1928; Richard Washburn Child, together with Luigi Barzini, Jr., served as the book's ghostwriter.

Background 
Mussolini dictated parts of the text to his brother Arnaldo Mussolini who handed the manuscripts, together with other material supplied by Mussolini's lover Margherita Sarfatti, to Richard Washburn Child (the former American ambassador to Italy). Child served together with Luigi Barzini, Jr. as a ghostwriter for the autobiography, which was mainly aimed at readers in the U.S. It was a paid work of propaganda and remained unpublished in Italy until 1971. It was first serialized in The Saturday Evening Post (May to Oct. 1928) and then published as a book, with a foreword, by Child. In this preface, he wrote:

Publishing history
The autobiography was first published as a book in gilt-lettered green cloth by Charles Scribner's Sons in 1928. The text's typescript is held in the Houghton Library at Harvard University. Hurst & Blackett reprinted a cheap edition in 1936. A Japanese translation was published in 1937. In 1939, Hutchinson & Co. published an edition with "specially authorized additions by arrangement and approval of Il Duce, bringing it up to the year 1939".

Greenwood Press reprinted the 1928 edition in 1970. In 1998, Da Capo Press published My Rise and Fall combining My Autobiography with The Fall of Mussolini: His Own Story (1948).

Contents
Foreword
A Sulphurous Land
My Father
The Book of Life (in some editions the first three chapters are one titled: Youth)
War and Its Effect upon a Man
Ashes and Embers
The Death Struggle of a Worn out Democracy
The Garden of Fascism
Toward Conquest of Power
Thus We Took Rome
Five Years of Government
New Paths
The Fascist State and the Future
En Route
Index

References

D'Agostino, Peter R. Rome in America. Transnational Catholic Ideology from the Risoregimento to Fascism. U of North Carolina P, 2004.
Diggins, John P. Mussolini and Fascism: the View from America. Princeton, N.J.: Princeton UP, 1972.
Fermi, Laura.  Mussolini. Chicago: Chicago UP, 1961.
Lindberg, Kathryn V. "Mass Circulation versus The Masses. Covering the Modern Magazine Scene." In: National Identities - Postamerican Narratives. Ed. Donald E. Pease. Duke UP, 1994, 279-310.

Political autobiographies
1928 non-fiction books
Works originally published in The Saturday Evening Post
Literature first published in serial form
Benito Mussolini